Hay Lodge Hospital is a health facility at Neidpath Road in Peebles, Scotland. It is managed by NHS Borders. Hay Lodge is a Category B listed building.

History
The hospital was commissioned to replace the ageing Peebles County Hospital on Rosetta Road and the Peebles War Memorial Hospital on Tweed Green. It was established by building modern hospital facilities in the grounds of Hay Lodge, a late 18th century building, in 1983. Hay Lodge was itself converted to become the administration and staff quarters of the hospital. The hospital was forced to suspend admissions because of a sickness outbreak in January 2020.

Notes

References

Hospitals in the Scottish Borders
1983 establishments in Scotland
Hospitals established in 1983
Hospital buildings completed in 1983
NHS Scotland hospitals
NHS Borders